Bryce Stuart Mackasey,  (August 25, 1921 – September 5, 1999) was a Canadian Member of Parliament, Cabinet minister, and Ambassador to Portugal.

Born in Quebec City, Quebec, he was elected as a Liberal candidate in the riding of Verdun in the 1962 federal election. He was re-elected in the 1963, 1965, 1968, 1972, and 1974 elections. He resigned in 1976 to run in the Quebec provincial election that year, and was elected to the Quebec National Assembly for the riding of  Notre-Dame-de-Grâce. He resigned in 1978 to run in a federal by-election in the riding of Ottawa Centre, but was defeated. From 1978 to 1979, he served briefly as President of Air Canada. He was re-elected in the riding of Lincoln in the 1980 election.

He held numerous ministerial positions including Labour, Manpower and Immigration, Secretary of State, Postmaster General of Canada and Consumer and Corporate Affairs.

When Mackasey left office in 1984 Prime Minister John Turner appointed him Ambassador to Portugal; this led to Conservative leader Brian Mulroney's famous comment about patronage, "There's no whore like an old whore". Mulroney canceled the appointment shortly after he was elected and appointed former Speaker of the House Lloyd Francis in Mackasey's place.

In 1970, he received an honorary doctorate from Sir George Williams University, which later became Concordia University.

References

External links

1921 births
1999 deaths
Ambassadors of Canada to Portugal
Anglophone Quebec people
Liberal Party of Canada MPs
Members of the House of Commons of Canada from Ontario
Members of the House of Commons of Canada from Quebec
Members of the King's Privy Council for Canada
Politicians from Quebec City
Postmasters General of Canada
Quebec Liberal Party MNAs